= Hajjampura =

- village
- Location within Madhya Pradesh Location within India
- Coordinates: 23.3532845°N 77.3812494°E
- Country: India
- State: Madhya Pradesh
- District: Bhopal
- Tehsil: Huzur
- Elevation: 485 m (1,591 ft)

Population (2011)
  - Total: 455
- Time zone: UTC+5:30 (IST)
- ISO 3166 code: MP-IN
- 2011 census code: 482368

Hajjampura is a village in the Bhopal district of Madhya Pradesh, India. It is located in the Huzur tehsil and the Phanda block.

== Demographics ==
According to the 2011 census of India, Hajjampura has 93 households. The effective literacy rate (i.e. the literacy rate of population excluding children aged 6 and below) is 56.84%.

Demographics (2011 Census)
	Total	Male	Female
Population	455	243	212
Children aged below 6 years	82	41	41
Scheduled caste	15	7	8
Scheduled tribe	88	50	38
Literates	212	130	82
Workers (all)	191	125	66
Main workers (total)	127	116	11
Main workers: Cultivators	24	20	4
Main workers: Agricultural labourers	18	12	6
Main workers: Household industry workers	0	0	0
Main workers: Other	85	84	1
Marginal workers (total)	64	9	55
Marginal workers: Cultivators	1	1	0
Marginal workers: Agricultural labourers	56	8	48
Marginal workers: Household industry workers	0	0	0
Marginal workers: Others	7	0	7
Non-workers	264	118	146
